Spencer Township, Ohio may refer to:

Spencer Township, Allen County, Ohio
Spencer Township, Guernsey County, Ohio
Spencer Township, Hamilton County, Ohio (defunct)
Spencer Township, Lucas County, Ohio
Spencer Township, Medina County, Ohio

See also
Spencer Township (disambiguation)

Ohio township disambiguation pages